The Iowa State League was a minor league baseball league that played from 1904 to 1907 and in 1912. The Class D level league had franchises based in Illinois and Iowa. The Ottumwa Snappers won league championships in 1904 and 1905. The Iowa State League evolved into the Central Association.

History
The Iowa State League began play in 1904 as an eight-team Class D level minor league in and around Iowa, United States.  The league played four seasons and ceased operations following the 1907 season. Seven of the eight 1907 Iowa State League teams formed the Central Association in 1908. The Iowa State League had the formal name as the Iowa League of Professional Baseball Clubs.

The Iowa State League reformed in 1912 as an Independent league. Estherville defeated Fort Dodge in the league playoffs to claim the championship. The league permanently folded after the season.

Cities represented

Standings & statistics

1904 to 1907
1904 Iowa State League schedule

1905 Iowa State League
schedule

1906 Iowa State League
schedule
  Boone moved to Clinton July 14.

1907 Iowa State League
schedule

1912
1912 Iowa State League 
schedule
  Clear Lake folded July 14  Playoffs: Estherville 4 games, Fort Dodge 1.

References

Defunct minor baseball leagues in the United States
Baseball leagues in Iowa
Sports leagues established in 1904
Sports leagues disestablished in 1912
Baseball leagues in Illinois
Sports leagues disestablished in 1907
Sports leagues established in 1912